Alurnus is a genus of beetles in the family Chrysomelidae.

Species 
The following 23 species are accepted within Alurnus:

 Alurnus batesii Baly, 1864
 Alurnus bicolor Staines, 2013
 Alurnus bipunctatus Olivier, 1792
 Alurnus boucardi Rosenberg, 1898
 Alurnus chapuisi Uhmann and Jolivet, 1952
 Alurnus costalis Rosenberg, 1898
 Alurnus crenatus Staines, 2013
 Alurnus dallieri Pic, 1926
 Alurnus eckardtae Günther, 1936
 Alurnus elysianus Thomson, 1856
 Alurnus grossus Fabricius, 1775
 Alurnus horni Uhmann, 1935
 Alurnus humeralis Rosenberg, 1898
 Alurnus lansbergei Sallé, 1849
 Alurnus mutabilis Waterhouse, 1881
 Alurnus obliquus Uhmann, 1961
 Alurnus octopunctatus Fairmaire, 1851
 Alurnus orbignyi Guérin-Méneville, 1840
 Alurnus ornatus Baly, 1869
 Alurnus salvini Baly, 1885
 Alurnus secernendus Uhmann, 1932b
 Alurnus sexguttatus Rosenberg, 1898
 Alurnus undatus Brême, 1844

References 

Cassidinae
Chrysomelidae genera
Beetles of Central America
Taxa named by Johan Christian Fabricius
Beetles described in 1775